WAVEBOY (born August 4, 1989) is an American singer-songwriter known for writing Hua Chenyu's International debut single For Forever.

WAVEBOY's music is primarily electropop and contains elements of subgenres such as synthwave and house music.

In February 2021, WAVEBOY signed an exclusive global publishing agreement with Universal Music Publishing Group China.

Discography
 The Greatest Thing - Colorful Mannings (KOSEN)  (2016)
 Thinking of You - Colorful Mannings (KOSEN)  (2016)
 For Forever - Hua Chenyu (2016)
 Baby Girl - Young G (2018)
 The Same Starlight Sky - One and a Half Summer OST (2014)
 The Fox's Treasure - WAVEBOY (2021)

References

External links

 

1995 births
Living people